The 1996 Oklahoma Sooners football team represented the University of Oklahoma during the 1996 NCAA Division I-A football season. They played their home games at Oklahoma Memorial Stadium and participated as members of the newly formed Big 12 Conference in the South Division. They were coached by John Blake.

Schedule

Roster

Awards
All-Big 12: LB Tyrell Peters

1997 NFL Draft

The following Sooners were selected in the 1997 NFL draft.

References

Oklahoma
Oklahoma Sooners football seasons
Oklahoma Sooners football